Saltillo is a town in Brown Township, Washington County, in the U.S. state of Indiana. The population was 92 at the 2010 census.

History
Saltillo was laid out and platted in 1849. It was named in commemoration of Saltillo, Mexico, the location of a battle in the Mexican–American War.

A post office was established at Saltillo in 1854, and remained in operation until it was discontinued in 1957.

Geography
Saltillo is located at  (38.664258, -86.289727).

Demographics

2010 census
As of the census of 2010, there were 92 people, 42 households, and 29 families living in the town. The racial makeup of the town was 98.9% White and 1.1% from other races. Hispanic or Latino of any race were 1.1% of the population.

There were 42 households, of which 19.0% had children under the age of 18 living with them, 54.8% were married couples living together, 9.5% had a female householder with no husband present, 4.8% had a male householder with no wife present, and 31.0% were non-families. 28.6% of all households were made up of individuals, and 11.9% had someone living alone who was 65 years of age or older. The average household size was 2.19 and the average family size was 2.66.

The median age in the town was 48.3 years. 15.2% of residents were under the age of 18; 10.8% were between the ages of 18 and 24; 18.5% were from 25 to 44; 33.6% were from 45 to 64; and 21.7% were 65 years of age or older. The gender makeup of the town was 50.0% male and 50.0% female.

2000 census
As of the census of 2000, there were 107 people, 47 households, and 33 families living in the town. The racial makeup of the town was 100.00% White. Hispanic or Latino of any race were 0.93% of the population.

There were 47 households, out of which 25.5% had children under the age of 18 living with them, 66.0% were married couples living together, 6.4% had a female householder with no husband present, and 27.7% were non-families. 25.5% of all households were made up of individuals, and 17.0% had someone living alone who was 65 years of age or older. The average household size was 2.28 and the average family size was 2.74.

In the town, the population was spread out, with 19.6% under the age of 18, 6.5% from 18 to 24, 28.0% from 25 to 44, 23.4% from 45 to 64, and 22.4% who were 65 years of age or older. The median age was 40 years. For every 100 females, there were 105.8 males. For every 100 females age 18 and over, there were 87.0 males.

The median income for a household in the town was $22,500, and the median income for a family was $51,250. Males had a median income of $38,125 versus $21,042 for females. The per capita income for the town was $16,253. There were 9.1% of families and 12.1% of the population living below the poverty line, including 16.7% of under eighteens and 20.8% of those over 64.

References

Towns in Washington County, Indiana
Towns in Indiana
Louisville metropolitan area
Populated places established in 1849
1849 establishments in Indiana